St. Columba's Hospital is a former psychiatric hospital in Sligo, County Sligo, Ireland.

History
The hospital, which was designed by William Deane Butler in the Elizabethan-style, opened as the Sligo Asylum in 1855. It became Sligo Mental Hospital in the 1920s and went on to become St. Columba's Hospital in the 1950s. After the introduction of deinstitutionalisation in the late 1980s the hospital went into a period of decline and closed in 1992. After being converted for hotel use, it re-opened as the Clarion Hotel in 2005 and was subsequently re-branded as the Clayton Hotel. As of 2021, 167 rooms are available for use.

References

Hospitals in County Sligo
Columbas
Hospital buildings completed in 1855
1855 establishments in Ireland
Hospitals established in 1855
Defunct hospitals in the Republic of Ireland
Hospitals disestablished in 1992
1992 disestablishments in Ireland
Hotels in County Sligo